Davies Chisopa (born 23 June 1973) is a Zambian politician. He is currently Member of the National Assembly for Mkushi South.

Biography
Chisopa contested the 2011 general elections as the Patriotic Front candidate in Mkushi South, but was defeated by the incumbent MP, Sydney Chisanga of the Movement for Multi-Party Democracy, who received 61% of the vote. However, Chisopa contested the results at the Supreme Court, claiming there had been electoral malpractice. The Supreme Court annulled the results and a by-election was held on 11 September 2014, in which Chisopa was elected to the National Assembly with a majority of 810 votes. In February 2015 he was appointed Minister for Central Province.

Chisopa was re-elected in the 2016 general elections, defeating Chisanga by 97 votes. In October 2017 he became a member of the Committee on National Economy, Trade and Labour Matters and the Committee on Local Government Accounts.

References

1973 births
Living people
Members of the National Assembly of Zambia
Patriotic Front (Zambia) politicians
Provincial Ministers of Zambia